The Clair Bee Coach of the Year Award honored the active men's NCAA Division I basketball coach who has made the most significant positive contributions to his sport during the preceding year. The winner reflected the character and professional qualities of Clair Bee, a Hall of Fame coach who many consider to be the best technical basketball coach in history, and a man who cared deeply about his players' well-being. The Hilton and Bee Awards were created by Chip Hilton Sports and the NCAA Foundation in 1996 as a way to promote positive character in the sport of basketball, a game upon which the legendary Bee had a great impact as a coach, administrator, innovator and teacher.

Winners

External links
Clair Bee Award at HoopHall.com

Awards established in 1997
College basketball coach of the year awards in the United States